Emeka Umeh (born 24 October 1999) is a Nigerian professional footballer who plays as a forward for AS Trenčín in the Fortuna liga.

Club career

Early career 
Born in Sabo, Nigeria, Umeh started playing football at a young age, with Zico FC a grassroot team in Kaduna State.

AS Trenčín 
In July 2018, Umeh joined Slovak side AS Trenčín. He scored his first goal in the Fortuna liga for AS Trenčín against iClinic Sereď. He was released from the club in the winter of 2020-21, when his contract was not renewed.

References

External links 

Nigerian footballers
Nigerian expatriate footballers
1999 births
Living people
People from Kaduna State
Association football forwards
Kaduna United F.C. players
Plateau United F.C. players
AS Trenčín players
Expatriate footballers in Slovakia
Nigerian expatriate sportspeople in Slovakia